Jon Roger Davis (born April 5, 1939) is an American actor and entrepreneur. He is best known for acting in the television series Dark Shadows and Alias Smith and Jones. He has also appeared in an episode of The Twilight Zone.

Education 
Davis was born in Louisville, Kentucky on April 5, 1939 and graduated from Columbia College in 1961, where he was classmates with Dark Shadows co-star Don Briscoe and director Brian De Palma.

Acting career
Davis first appeared on television in 1962. He portrayed Pvt. Roger Gibson in the television series The Gallant Men. In 1963, he co-starred with Richard Egan in the series Redigo. In 1964, Davis appeared in one episode of The Twilight Zone, "Spur of the Moment", co-starring Diana Hyland, and had a supporting role in the 1964 film Ride the Wild Surf. He guest-starred twice in the western TV series Bonanza, as Harold Stanley in 1966 and Bert Yates in 1971.

From 1968 to 1970, Davis garnered attention playing multiple characters on the daytime Gothic soap opera Dark Shadows. He played Peter Bradford, Jeff Clark, Ned Stuart, Dirk Wilkins, and Charles Delaware Tate.

In 1971, Davis narrated the voiceover theme sequence for the western series Alias Smith and Jones, starring Pete Duel as Hannibal Heyes/Joshua Smith and Ben Murphy as Jedidiah "Kid" Curry/Thaddeus Jones. He also appeared in one of the episodes ("Smiler with a Gun") as slick gunfighter Danny Bilson. Bilson has the distinction of being the only character kind-hearted Kid Curry was ever driven to kill during the series. Also in 1971, he appeared in season 12, episode 17 of Bonanza.

When Pete Duel committed suicide at the end of 1971, Davis replaced him as Hannibal Heyes. However, after Davis completed just 17 episodes, it was clear the show would not achieve the same level of popularity it had with Pete Duel. The series ended in 1973. Competition from the popular Flip Wilson Show siphoned the show's ratings.

Davis continued to act in guest-starring roles on TV series throughout the 1970s as well as the occasional film appearance in movies such as Killer Bees (1974), Flash and the Firecat (1975), Nashville Girl (1976), Ruby (1977), and Aspen (1977), and he has been a voiceover actor for thousands of TV and radio commercials. In 2000, he appeared in the film Beyond the Pale. Davis regularly attends fan conventions for both Alias Smith and Jones and Dark Shadows, and in 2011, he reprised his role of Charles Delaware Tate in both The Blind Painter and The Crimson Pearl, new audio plays of Dark Shadows. In 2019, Davis appeared as himself in the documentary movie Master of Dark Shadows, a direct-to-DVD release.

Business career
Davis developed land and built luxury homes in southern California until 2010, and continues to design and renovate luxury properties in the greater Los Angeles area as of 2022.  He owns an interest in movie developer Lonetree Entertainment in Los Angeles. He also renovated the famous Seelbach Hotel in Louisville, Kentucky, and built a luxury condominium building there, known as 1400 Willow. His family owned Davis Tire Company in Louisville.

Personal life
In 1968, Davis married actress Jaclyn Smith. After a brief separation, they divorced in January 1975. During his second marriage to Ohioan Suzanne Irwin (Emerson), Roger became a father to a daughter Margaret in 1981. The family resided at Spring Station, Louisville, Kentucky's oldest home, built in 1791. After a divorce in 1983, Davis was married to realtor Alice LeGette from 1985 to 1988. In 1991, Davis married Los Angeles attorney Donna Jenis; they divorced in 1996.

References

External links

1939 births
American male soap opera actors
American male television actors
American male voice actors
American real estate businesspeople
Living people
Male actors from Louisville, Kentucky
People from Greater Los Angeles
Columbia College (New York) alumni